EX5 may refer to:

Vehicles

Automobiles
 BJEV EX5, a 2019–present Chinese compact electric SUV
 EVeasy EX5, a 2019–present Chinese subcompact electric SUV
 Weltmeister EX5, a 2018–present Chinese compact electric SUV

Motorcycles
 Honda EX5, a 1958–present Japanese underbone motorcycle

Other uses
 Yamaha EX5, a synthesizer/workstation